Dalecarlia Reservoir is the primary storage basin for drinking water in Washington, D.C., fed by an underground aqueduct in turn fed by low  dams which divert portions of the Potomac River near Great Falls and Little Falls. The reservoir is located between Spring Valley and the Palisades, two neighborhoods in Northwest Washington, and Brookmont, a neighborhood in Montgomery County, Maryland.

The  reservoir was completed in 1858 by the United States Army Corps of Engineers as part of the Washington Aqueduct project.
It began providing water on January 3, 1859. Initially the reservoir provided water to the city from the adjacent Little Falls Branch until the aqueduct construction was completed. Regular water service from the Potomac River source through the aqueduct commenced in 1864. The reservoir was modified in 1895 and 1935 to improve water quality and increase water supply.

In 1942, the headquarters of the Army Map Service was established on the grounds adjacent to the reservoir; several buildings constructed in the 1940s still exist.  In 1946, its headquarters moved to the nearby Sumner Site, which is today the Intelligence Community Campus-Bethesda.

The Capital Crescent Trail runs adjacent to the reservoir and through the center of the pumping campus. The boundary between Maryland and the District of Columbia passes through the reservoir.  A historic  D.C. boundary marker (Northwest No. 5) is located in a woodland east of the reservoir.  Another (Northwest No. 4) is located a short distance east of the Capital Crescent Trail, near the Dalecarlia water purification facility.

The reservoir is maintained by the Washington Aqueduct division of the Army Corps of Engineers.

Climate

According to the Köppen Climate Classification system, the area has a humid subtropical climate, abbreviated "Cfa" on climate maps.

See also
Georgetown Reservoir
McMillan Reservoir
Washington Aqueduct

References

External links
 Washington Aqueduct Division - U.S. Army Corps of Engineers

Bethesda, Maryland
Brookmont, Maryland
Lakes of Montgomery County, Maryland
Reservoirs in Washington, D.C.
Reservoirs in Maryland
Chesapeake Bay watershed
Potomac River watershed
United States Army Corps of Engineers
The Palisades (Washington, D.C.)